James Brooks was an English violinist and composer who was born in Bath c. 1760 and died in London in December 1809.

Early life 
James Brooks must have been born around 1760 as he was declared to be 23 years old when he was recommended for admission to the Royal Society of Musicians in March 1783.

His father, John Brooks, was a violinist in Thomas Linley's band, in the band of the theatre and a music teacher in Bath, where he died before 1787.

At eleven years old James was already playing along his father at the New Assembly Rooms under Linley, however, according to the recommendation for his admission to the Royal Society of Musicians in March 1783, he started his fully fledged professional career as a musician around 1776.

Career as a musician 

It seems that James Brooks took over from Thomas Shaw as first violin, once the latter had moved to London, in the concerts organised by Herschel. For instance, on 12 October 1778, the Salisbury and Winchester Journal advertises as follows:
 MUSIC MEETING.
 ON Thurſday the 15th of October inſtant, will be a SACRED PERFORMANCE of Vocal and Inſtrumental MUSIC, in the Church at Trowbridge. — The muſic taken from the Oratorio of the Meſſhiah, with Mr. Handel's Coronation Anthems The King ſhall rejoice, and Zadock the Prieſt. 
 The principal Vocal Parts by Miſs CANTELO, and Mr. CORFE from Saliſbury. The Firſt Violin by Mr. BROOKS, junr. The other parts of the inſtrumental band by the moſt approved performers in Bath, &c, and the Choruſes will be particularly full. The whole to be conducted Mr. HERSCHEL. —Service will begin at eleven o'clock. 
 Particulars of the performance will be expreſſed in the bills and given with the tickets. — Tickets 2s. 6d. each to be had at the George Inn, at Trowbridge, and of Mr. BROOKS, King's-mead-ſtreet, Bath.

And on Thursday 27 May 1779, the Bath Chronicle and Weekly Gazette has the following advertisement for the premiere of a series of shows in Bath in the style of the Vauxhall Pleasure Gardens of London:

 BATH SPRING-GARDENS VAUXHALL. 
 ON Wednesday next, the 2d of June, will be the Firſt MUSICAL EVENING's ENTERTAINMENT, with illuminations and improvements, after the manner of Vauxhall, London. The principal vocal part by Miſs Cantelo, Mrs. Higgins, and Mr. Du-Bellamy; the firſt violin by Mr. Brooks, jun. a concerto on the clarionet [sic.] by Mr. Alexander Herſchel, and the direction of the muſic by Mr. Herſchel, fen. 
 This entertainment will be divided into three acts, the firſt of which will begin it ſeven o'clock. 
 Ticket! to be had it the gate of the Gardens, and at Miſs Purdie's Perfume-ſhop, top of the North Parade, at 1s. each.
 Public Tea and Spring-Gardens every Saturday Evening when the wheather is fine, attended with French-Horns and Clarionets [sic.]. 
 Admittance 1s. which entitles the bearer to Tea or Coffee.

By his twenties, James Brooks, it seems, had already made quite a place for himself in the community of Bathonian musicians. On Thursday 11 May 1780 he is once again listed as band leader in a special event, as advertised by the Bath Chronicle and Weekly Gazette:
 Miſs CANTELO moſt reſpectfully informs the Nobility, Gentry, and her Friends in particular, that her BREAKFAST CONCERT of Vocal and Inſtrumental MUSIC, will be at Mr. Gyde's Rooms on Monday the 15th May inſtant. The vocal parts by Miſs Cantelo, Mr. Griffin, Mr Stevens, &c. the firſt violin by Mr. Brooks, jun. and the harpſichord by Mr. Markordt.
 The words of the songs, glees and catches, will be given at the door the morning of performance. Clarinets and Horns during breakfast, which will be on the table at ten o'clock; the Concert to begin at half paſt eleven. Tickets to be had at Mr Gyde's Rooms, Pump-Room, and of Miſs Cantelo in Orchard-ſtreet, at 3s. 6d. each, Breakfast included.

He played a concerto of his own composition in a concert in Bath on 23 April 1782 or 1783, but in March 1783, as per the recommendation for his admission to the Royal Society of Musicians, James Brooks is "engaged at the opera &c", in London. Indeed on Saturday 9 October 1783 is represented at the Royal Circus the burletta A Lover's Device, which includes two songs composed by Brooks: As when some Maiden in her Teens, sung by Mr Burkitt, and Now Home again from foreign Climes, sung by Mr Burkitt and Miss Romanzini.

In 1784 he played first violin at the Commemoration of Handel (Handel Memorial Concerts at Westminster Abbey and the Pantheon) for which a total of 493 performers were gathered together.

In 1792 and 1794 he plays at the annual spring concerts at St Paul's for the benefit of the clergy, but in parallel is listed in the bills for a concert in Bristol in the 1790s and carries on playing at concerts there in 1791, 1792 and 1798.

In 1800 he became the band leader at Vauxhall, "in the place of Mr Mountain". This gave him the opportunity to further compose and publish songs, and most probably also instrumental music, for the pleasure gardens there, for instance William and Ann, Damon and Phillis, Ere my dear Laddie gade to Sea, When Britain's Sons to Arms are led and How sweetly did the Moments pass sung by popular singers such as the tenor Charles Dignum and the likes.

In 1804, when George III suffered another bout of his illness, James Brooks composed an hymn for the sovereign's recovery.

He may also have played under Thomas Shaw at the Drury Lane theatre for the 1807–08 season.

Illness and death 
James seems to have fallen ill in the second half of 1809 and eventually died in December of the same year. The Royal Society of Musicians had granted him 5 guineas "on account of his illness" in October. After his death, his widow was granted £8 for the funeral costs (£372.20 in today's money) and £2 12s 6d monthly (£122.13 in today's money) as a support allowance.

Works

Instrumental music

Chamber music

Vocal music

Religious music

Discography 

 The Violin Concerto No.1 in D is available on:

English Classical Violin Concertos, Elizabeth Wallfisch, The Parley of Instruments, Peter Holman (Helios, CDH55260, 2008)

Sources 
 Highfill, Philip H.; Burnim, Kalman A.; Langhans, Edward A. (1973). A Biographical Dictionary of Actors, Actresses, Musicians, Dancers, Managers & Other Stage Personnel in London, 1660-1800. SIU Press. p. 355.
 European Magazine and London Review.
 British Newspaper Archive

Notes

External links 

 

1760 births
1809 deaths
Members of the Royal Society of Musicians
18th-century British male musicians
18th-century English people
British classical musicians
British male violinists
British violinists
Classical-period composers
English classical musicians
English classical violinists
English male classical composers
English violinists
Male classical violinists
People from Bath, Somerset